Dachan Food (Asia) Limited is one of the largest chicken meat products and feeds suppliers in China. It is a Mainland China-based subsidiary of Taiwan-based Dachan Great Wall Enterprise. It engages in animal feed production, chicken meat processing, and supply of processed food. Kentucky Fried Chicken and McDonald’s are its major clients.

The company is headquartered in Hong Kong with production plants in Dalian, Liaoning. It was listed on the Hong Kong Stock Exchange in 2007.

References

External links
Dachan Food (Asia) Limited

Companies listed on the Hong Kong Stock Exchange
Privately held companies of China
Companies established in 1995
Food manufacturers of Hong Kong
Animal food manufacturers